Colombians are people from Colombia or of Colombian ancestry.

Colombians may also refer to:

 Citizens of Colombia, a country in South America.
 Colombian diaspora - emigrants of Colombia and their descendants, and Colombians living abroad
 Specific Colombians, collectively.  See Lists of Colombians.

See also 
 Colombian (disambiguation)